The Best American Essays is a yearly anthology of magazine articles published in the United States.  It was started in 1986 and is now part of The Best American Series published by HarperCollins. Articles are chosen using the same procedure with other titles in the Best American series; the series editor chooses about 100 article candidates, from which the guest editor picks 25 or so for publication; the remaining runner-up articles listed in the appendix. The series is edited by Robert Atwan, and Joyce Carol Oates assisted in the editing process until 2000 with the publication of The Best American Essays of the Century.

Guest editors

 1986: Elizabeth Hardwick
 1987: Gay Talese
 1988: Annie Dillard
 1989: Geoffrey Wolff
 1990: Justin Kaplan
 1991: Joyce Carol Oates
 1992: Susan Sontag
 1993: Joseph Epstein
 1994: Tracy Kidder
 1995: Jamaica Kincaid
 1996: Geoffrey C. Ward
 1997: Ian Frazier
 1998: Cynthia Ozick
 1999: Edward Hoagland
 2000: Alan Lightman
 2001: Kathleen Norris
 2002: Stephen Jay Gould
 2003: Anne Fadiman
 2004: Louis Menand
 2005: Susan Orlean
 2006: Lauren Slater
 2007: David Foster Wallace
 2008: Adam Gopnik
 2009: Mary Oliver
 2010: Christopher Hitchens
 2011: Edwidge Danticat
 2012: David Brooks
 2013: Cheryl Strayed
 2014: John Jeremiah Sullivan
 2015: Ariel Levy
 2016: Jonathan Franzen
 2017: Leslie Jamison
 2018: Hilton Als
 2019: Rebecca Solnit
 2020: André Aciman
 2021: Kathryn Schulz
 2022: Alexander Chee

Contributing publications

 The Alaska Quarterly Review
 The Baffler
 BuzzFeed
 Electric Literature
 The Florida Review
 Granta
 Harper's Magazine
 The Kenyon Review
 Lapham's Quarterly
 n+1
 The New York Times Magazine
 North American Review
 Oxford American
 The Threepenny Review
 Tin House
 Transition Magazine
 Virginia Quarterly Review

References

Book series introduced in 1986
Essays
Publications established in 1986
Houghton Mifflin books
1986 establishments in the United States